This article refers to sports broadcasting contracts in Spain. For a list of broadcasting rights in other countries, see Sports television broadcast contracts.

Football

National Team
Spain national football team (2018–28):
TVE (UEFA Nations League, UEFA Euro 2024, European Qualifiers and all friendly games)
National competitions
Liga F (2022–27):
DAZN (8/8 games exclusively per 30 matchday)
Gol Play (Best game per 30 matchday and highlights)
La Liga (2022–27):
Movistar Plus+ (5/10 games per 35 matchday with full 10 games per 3 matchday)
DAZN (5/10 games per 35 matchday)
Gol Play (1/10 game per matchday and highlights)
La Liga 2 (2022–27):
LaLiga SmartBank TV (11/11 games per matchday and promotion playoffs)
#Vamos por Movistar Plus+ (2/11 games per matchday)
La Liga 2B
Footters (all local matches of selected clubs)
Local and regional TV stations (selected matches)
La Liga 3
Footters (all local matches of selected clubs)
Local and regional TV stations (selected matches)
Copa del Rey (2022–25):
TVE (selected matches)
Movistar Plus+ (all matches)
Local and regional TV stations (selected early rounds matches)
Supercopa de España (2022–25):
Movistar Plus+ (all matches)

FIFA
FIFA World Cup (2022):
Movistar Plus+ (all matches)
TVE
FIFA Club World Cup (2022):
Mediaset
FIFA U20/U17 World Cups (2024):
UEFA
UEFA Women's Champions League (2021–25): DAZN
UEFA Champions League (until 2023-24)
UEFA Europa League
UEFA Europa Conference League (from 2021)
UEFA Super Cup
UEFA Youth League:
Movistar Plus+ (all matches of all rounds)
TVE (Champions League final only, starting in 2022)
UEFA Women’s Euro (2025)
UEFA Euro (2024)
UEFA Euro U21 (2023 and 2025)
UEFA U19/U17
UEFA Nations League and European Qualifiers (2022–28):
TVE

Europe

England
Premier League: DAZN (until 2024-25)
FA Cup and FA Community Shield: DAZN
EFL: DAZN
Germany
Bundesliga: Movistar Plus+ (until 2023-24)
DFB-Pokal: Movistar Plus+
Norway
Eliteserien: Eurosport
Russia
Russian Premier League: LaLigaSportsTV
Sweden
Allsvenskan: Eurosport
Italy
Serie A: Movistar Plus+ (until 2023-24)
Coppa Italia: DAZN (until 2023-24)
Supercoppa Italiana: DAZN (until 2024)
France
Ligue 1: Telecinco, TVG, TV3 (often only broadcast PSG matches)

America

Leagues
Argentine Primera División: Movistar Plus+
Campeonato Brasileiro Série A: Movistar Plus+
Major League Soccer: DAZN

CONMEBOL
Copa Libertadores: DAZN (until 2022)
Copa Sudamericana: DAZN (until 2022)
Recopa Sudamericana: DAZN (until 2022)
CONCACAF
Gold Cup: Gol Play

Asia

Leagues
A-League: Movistar Plus+
J-League: YouTube (live coverage for J2 and League Cup matches only, with highlights for all leagues and league cup)
K-League: YouTube

Basketball 

National Team
Spain men's national basketball team
Cuatro (EuroBasket and World Cup matches until 2021)
Teledeporte (all friendly games)
Spain women's national basketball team
Teledeporte (all games)
National competitions
Liga ACB:
#Vamos por Movistar Plus+ (best game per round until 2023)
Deportes por Movistar Plus+ (rest of games until 2023)
Copa del Rey:
#Vamos por Movistar Plus+ (all matches of all rounds until 2023)
Supercopa de España:
#Vamos por Movistar Plus+ (all matches of all rounds until 2023)
Liga Femenina:
Teledeporte (best game per round)
Copa de la Reina:
Teledeporte (all matches of all rounds)
Supercopa de España Femenina:
Teledeporte (final exclusively)

FIBA: DAZN
FIBA World Cup
FIBA Intercontinental Cup
Europe
EuroLeague (1st tier):
DAZN (all games of all rounds until 2023)
EuroCup (2nd tier):
DAZN (all games of all rounds until 2023)
Basketball Champions League:
DAZN (Spanish teams)
USA
NBA:
#Vamos por Movistar Plus+ (selected games until 2023)
Deportes por Movistar Plus+ (at least one game per day until 2023)
Italy
Lega Basket Serie A: Eurosport Player

Source:

Multi-discipline events
IOC
Olympic and Paralympic Games:
Eurosport (from 2018 until 2024)
DMAX
Eurosport and TVE (from 2026 until 2032)

American football
USA
NFL:
 #Vamos por Movistar Plus+: Kickoff game, Sunday Night Football, one playoff game per round, Super Bowl
 Deportes por Movistar Plus+: Thursday Night Football, two Sunday afternoon games, NFL RedZone, Monday Night Football, one Thanksgiving game, the rest of the Playoffs games, Super Bowl

Aquatics
FINA
FINA World Aquatics Championships: Teledeporte, Eurosport
LEN
LEN European Aquatics Championships: Teledeporte, Eurosport
European Water Polo Championship: Teledeporte

Athletics
IAAF
World Championships: Teledeporte, Eurosport
World Indoor Championships: Teledeporte
European Championships: Teledeporte, Eurosport
World Athletics Continental Tour: Teledeporte
Diamond League: Deportes por Movistar Plus+

Combat Sports
Boxing
Premier Boxing Champions: DAZN
Matchroom: DAZN
Golden Boy: DAZN
Top Rank: DAZN, Eurosport
Dream Boxing: DAZN (all fights until 2025)

Kickboxing
King of Kings: DAZN (all fights until 2025)

Mixed Martial Arts
UFC: Gol Play, DAZN
Bellator MMA: Gol Play, DAZN
Bushido MMA: DAZN (all fights until 2025)
Cage Warriors: Eurosport
Enfusion: Gol Play
M-1 Challenge: Gol Play
ONE Championship: Gol Play

Cycling
UCI
UCI World Championships: Teledeporte, Eurosport
UCI World Tour: Teledeporte, Esport3, Eurosport
UCI Europe Tour: Eurosport
UCI ProSeries: Esport3
UCI Cyclo-cross World Cup:
UCI Cyclo-cross World Championships: Eurosport
UCI Mountain Bike World Cup: Teledeporte, Esport3 (National events only)
UCI Mountain Bike World Championships:
Grand Tour
Vuelta a España: TVE, Eurosport
Tour de France: TVE, Eurosport
Giro d'Italia: ETB 1, Eurosport
National
Volta a Catalunya: Teledeporte Esport3 Eurosport

Field hockey
FIH
Men's World Cup: Teledeporte, Eurosport
Women's World Cup: Teledeporte, Eurosport
Men's Pro League: Gol Play (Spain matches only) and DAZN (Spain matches and grand finals), Eurosport (regular season matches)
Women's Pro League: DAZN (grand finals), Eurosport (regular season matches)
EHF
EuroHockey Championship: Teledeporte
EuroHockey League: Teledeporte
EuroHockey Club Champions Cup: Teledeporte
National
DH Masculina: Teledeporte
DH Femenina: Teledeporte
Copa del Rey: Eurosport
Copa de la Reina: Eurosport

Futsal

National Team
Spain national futsal team: Teledeporte

FIFA
FIFA Futsal World Cup:

National
Primera División: Gol Play, LaLigaSportsTV
Copa de España: Gol Play
Supercopa de España: Gol Play
Copa del Rey: Eurosport

UEFA
UEFA Futsal Champions League: Gol Play (Final four only)
UEFA Futsal Euro:
UEFA Women's Futsal Euro: Gol Play (Final four only)
UEFA Under-19 Futsal Euro: Teledeporte

Golf
Major Championships
U.S. Masters: Movistar Golf
PGA Championship: Movistar Golf
U.S. Open: Movistar Golf
British Open: Movistar Golf
World Championships
Ryder Cup: Movistar Golf
PGA Tour: Movistar Golf (early coverage available on GolfTV)
PGA European Tour: Movistar Golf

Gymnastics
FIG
Gymnastics World Championships: Teledeporte
UEG
European Men's Artistic Gymnastics Championships: Teledeporte
European Women's Artistic Gymnastics Championships: Teledeporte

Handball
IHF
World Men's and Women's Championships: Teledeporte
EHF
Men's and Women's Euros (national teams): Teledeporte
Club championships: DAZN (2020–21 until 2025–26) and Esport3 (Barcelona matches only)
Men's and Women's Champions Leagues
Men's and Women's European Leagues
Men's and Women's European Cups
National
Liga Asobal: Gol Play, LaLigaSportsTV
Liga Femenina: Teledeporte

Horse racing
Turf
 Spanish professional circuit horse racing "Las Carreras": Movistar Plus+
 #Vamos por Movistar Plus+
 Deportes por Movistar Plus+

Motorsport
FIA
Formula 1: DAZN F1 Mediaset
Formula 2: DAZN F1
Formula 3: DAZN F1
W Series: Teledeporte Esport3
Formula E: Eurosport
Endurance: Eurosport
World Touring Car Cup: Eurosport
World Rally Championship: Teledeporte & Esport3 (Event Highlights)
Dakar Rally: Eurosport, Teledeporte, Esport3
Extreme E: Teledeporte (Event Highlights)
FIM
MotoGP: DAZN Teledeporte
Moto2: DAZN
Moto3: DAZN
MotoE: DAZN
Superbike World Championship: DAZN, Teledeporte
Endurance: Eurosport
Motocross MXGP: Teledeporte
Trial and X-Trial World Championship: Teledeporte, Esport3
USA
IndyCar: Movistar Plus+
NASCAR: Movistar Plus+, Esport3
AMA Supercross: Esport3

Paddle
FIP
Premier Padel: Teledeporte (until 2022)
Padel World Championship:
SETPOINT EVENTS S.A.
World Padel Tour: Movistar Plus+ (until 2023)

Rugby union

World
Rugby World Cup: Movistar Plus+
Test Matches: Movistar Plus+
Europe
Six Nations: Movistar Plus+
European Championship: Teledeporte (Spain national team only)
EPCR
European Champions Cup: Movistar Plus+
European Challenge Cup:
European Continental Shield: 

Spain
División de Honor de Rugby: Teledeporte
Copa del Rey de Rugby: Teledeporte

Sailing
ISAF ≈ World Sailing
Special Events:
America's Cup: Teledeporte
SailGP: Teledeporte
FNOB
Barcelona World Race: Teledeporte

Snooker
WPBSA
World Snooker:
 Eurosport (most tournaments)
 DAZN (some tournaments)

Tennis
ITF
United Cup: Teledeporte
Davis Cup: Movistar Plus+
Billie Jean King Cup: Teledeporte
Grand Slam
Australian Open: Eurosport
French Open: Eurosport
 DMAX
Wimbledon: Movistar Plus+
 #Vamos por Movistar Plus+
 Ellas #V por Movistar Plus+
 Deportes por Movistar Plus+
US Open: Eurosport

ATP
ATP Finals: Movistar Plus+
ATP 1000: Movistar Plus+, Teledeporte (Madrid Open only)
ATP 500: Movistar Plus+, Teledeporte Esport3 (Barcelona Open only)
ATP 250: Movistar Plus+, Teledeporte (Mallorca Open, Gijón Open only)
Laver Cup: Eurosport
Others
Tie Break Tens: Teledeporte

WTA
WTA Finals: DAZN, Teledeporte
WTA 1000: DAZN, Teledeporte
WTA 500: DAZN, Teledeporte
WTA 250: DAZN, Teledeporte
Esport3: Paula Badosa singles matches only

Volleyball
FIVB
FIVB Volleyball Men's World Championship: Teledeporte
FIVB Volleyball Women's World Championship: Teledeporte
FIVB Beach Volleyball World Championships: Teledeporte
CEV
Men's European Volleyball Championship: Teledeporte
Women's European Volleyball Championship: Teledeporte
CEV Champions League: Eurosport
CEV Women's Champions League: Eurosport
National
Superliga Masculina: Teledeporte
Superliga Femenina: Teledeporte

Winter sports
FIS Alpine World Ski Championships: Eurosport
FIS Alpine Ski World Cup: Eurosport
FIS Nordic World Ski Championships:
FIS Nordic Combined World Cup:
FIS Snowboard World Championships:
FIS Snowboard World Cup:
FIS Freestyle World Ski Championships:
FIS Freestyle Ski World Cup:
ISMF Ski Mountaineering World Championships:
ISMF Ski Mountaineering World Cup: Teledeporte
Freeride World Tour: Teledeporte, Esport3
IBU Biathlon World Championships: Eurosport
IBU Biathlon World Cup: Eurosport

General interest sports
By article 20.1 of the LGCA 7/2010 law, all these events must be broadcast on FTA-TV:

 Summer and Winter Olympics
 Official matches of the Spain men's and Spain women's national football teams.
 Official games of the Spain men's and Spain women's national basketball teams.
 Both semifinals and the final of the UEFA European Championship and the FIFA World Cup.
 Champions League and Copa del Rey finals.
 A match per Matchday of La Liga.

 Auto racing and motorcycle racing Grand Prix that are held in Spain.
 Games played by the Spain men's and Spain women's national handball teams on European and World Championships.
 Vuelta a España
 Cycling World Championships.
 European and World athletics and aquatic Championships events with Spanish athletes.
 National and international events that are held in Spain using total or partial national or regional funds.

Notes

References

Spain
Television in Spain